Bora Gulari (born October 22, 1975) is an American competitive sailor. He competed at the 2016 Summer Olympics in Rio de Janeiro, in the mixed Nacra 17.

He was US Sailor of the Year in 2009 and is a 2001 graduate of the University of Michigan's College of Engineering.

References

External links

1975 births
Living people
American male sailors (sport)
Olympic sailors of the United States
Sailors at the 2016 Summer Olympics – Nacra 17
US Sailor of the Year
University of Michigan College of Engineering alumni
2021 America's Cup sailors
 Michigan Wolverines sailors